William Bowers (January 17, 1916 – March 27, 1987) was an American reporter, playwright, and screenwriter. He worked as a reporter in Long Beach, California and for Life magazine, and specialized in writing comedy-westerns. He also turned out several thrillers.

Career

Bowers' first play was Where Do We Go From Here? that ran for 15 performances in 1968.

RKO
Bowers signed with RKO. His first credited screenplay was My Favorite Spy for Kay Kyser in 1942. Also at that studio Bowers helped write the musical comedy Seven Days' Leave (1942), which was a huge hit, and The Adventures of a Rookie (1943) with the team of Carney and Brown. He also did Higher and Higher (1943), Frank Sinatra's first movie.

War service
During World War II, Bowers served in the United States Army Air Forces Civilian Pilot Training Program where he met Arch Hall Sr. Bowers later wrote a screenplay based on his experiences, The Last Time I Saw Archie, where Jack Webb played Bowers.<ref>p.3 Weaver, Tom  Richard Alden Interview I Talked with a Zombie: Interviews with 23 Veterans of Horror and Sci-fi Films and Television
McFarland, 2009</ref>

Post war
He wrote Sing Your Way Home (1945) with Jack Haley for RKO.

For Columbia he helped write The Notorious Lone Wolf (1946) and at Warner Bros did the Cole Porter biopic Night and Day (1946). For Republic Pictures he provided the story for The Fabulous Suzanne (1946) and he worked on Paramount's Ladies' Man (1947) for Eddie Bracken.

Universal
At Universal Bowers wrote The Web (1947), a noir, and Deanna Durbin's second last film Something in the Wind (1947). He provided the story for the Abbott and Costello comedy The Wistful Widow of Wagon Gap (1948) and wrote the Yvonne de Carlo-Dan Duryea Westerns Black Bart, Highwayman (1948) and River Lady (1948). He did some uncredited work on United Artists' Pitfall (1948).

He wrote a noir, Larceny (1948) then did a Sonja Henie musical, The Countess of Monte Cristo (1948).

A play he wrote entitled West of Tomorrow was filmed by 20th Century Fox as Jungle Patrol. Bowers did some uncredited work on Criss Cross (1949) and provided the story for the de Carlo vehicle, The Gal Who Took the West (1949). He did some script work on Abandoned (1949).

The Gunfighter
In 1950 he was Oscar nominated for the gritty Gregory Peck Western, The Gunfighter at Fox.

Bowers wrote Convicted (1950) for Columbia, Mrs. O'Malley and Mr. Malone (1951) for MGM, Cry Danger (1951) for Robert Parrish at RKO, The Mob (1951) for Parrish at Columbia, and The San Francisco Story (1952) for Parrish at RKO.

He did Assignment: Paris (1952) for Parrish at Columbia and Split Second (1953) for Dick Powell at RKO. He did "The Girl on the Park Bench" (1953) for Powell's Four Star Theatre and some work on Beautiful But Dangerous (1954) for RKO.

For Where's Raymond? (1953) Bowers wrote the episodes "Christmas" and "Redecorate the Coffeeshop". He did "Trouble with Youth" for Ford Television Theatre (1954).

At Columbia he did Tight Spot (1955) and 5 Against the House (1955) for Phil Karlson. Bowers wrote "Prosper's Old Mother" (1955) and "It's Sunny Again" (1956) for General Electric Theatre and "Shoot the Moon" (1956) for Jane Wyman Presents The Fireside Theatre. At Fox he did a musical The Best Things in Life Are Free (1956).

Universal hired him for the remake of My Man Godfrey in 1957.

The Sheepman
At MGM he wrote The Sheepman (1958) which earned him a second Oscar nomination. He stayed on at MGM to do The Law and Jake Wade (1958), and Imitation General (1959). Bowers wrote a Bob Hope comedy for company, Alias Jesse James (1959) and did two films for Jack Webb, Deadline Midnight (1959) and The Last Time I Saw Archie (1961).

Bowers was reunited with Glenn Ford in Company of Cowards? (1964). He wrote a Jerry Lewis comedy, Way... Way Out (1966) and a Western The Ride to Hangman's Tree (1967).

Support Your Local Sheriff
Bowers produced the last film that he wrote, the  Western parody Support Your Local Sheriff! (1969). He also had a bit part as an actor in The Godfather Part II (1974).

He wrote a TV movie for Burt Kennedy, Sidekicks (1974). He focused on TV movies and an independent production: The Gun and the Pulpit (1974), Mobile Two (1975) (which he produced) Kate Bliss and the Ticker Tape Kid (1978), Shame, Shame on the Bixby Boys (1978), The Wild Wild West Revisited (1979), and More Wild Wild West (1980).

Filmography
Writer
 My Favorite Spy (1942)
 The Fabulous Suzanne (1946)
 Larceny (1948)
 The Gunfighter (1950)
 Assignment – Paris! (1952)
 Imitation General (1958)
 -30- (1959)
 The Last Time I Saw Archie (1961)
 Support Your Local Sheriff (1969)

Actor
 The Godfather Part II'' (1974) - Senate Committee Chairman

References

External links

1916 births
1987 deaths
American male screenwriters
People from Las Cruces, New Mexico
Screenwriters from New Mexico
20th-century American male writers
20th-century American screenwriters
United States Army Air Forces pilots of World War II